The 1997 Mid-Eastern Athletic Conference men's basketball tournament took place March 3–8, 1997, at Joseph G. Echols Memorial Hall in Norfolk, Virginia. Coppin State defeated , 81–74 (OT) in the championship game, to win its second MEAC Tournament title.

The Eagles earned an automatic bid to the 1997 NCAA tournament as #15 seed in the East region. In the round of 64, Coppin State upset #2 seed South Carolina 78–65. It was the first win for a MEAC team in the NCAA Tournament, the first time a #15 seed won an NCAA Tournament game by double figures, and only the third time a #15 seed beat a #2 seed.

Format
Nine of ten conference members participated, with the top 8 teams receiving a bye to the quarterfinal round.

Bracket

* denotes overtime period

References

MEAC men's basketball tournament
1996–97 Mid-Eastern Athletic Conference men's basketball season
MEAC men's basketball tournament
Basketball competitions in Norfolk, Virginia
College basketball tournaments in Virginia